Kiran Kumar (born 22 October 1976), known by his screen name Prem, is an Indian film director in Kannada cinema.

Personal life 
Prem was born as Kiran Kumar on 22 October 1976 in Maddur, in the Mandya district of the Indian state of Karnataka, to Rajappa and Bhagyamma. He is married to actress-turned-producer Rakshita and they have a son named Surya.

Career
Prem started his career as assistant director on the film Nishkarsha (1993), working with Sunil Kumar Desai, while he was pursuing his pre-university course. Upon completion of the film, he returned to his hometown Mandya to complete the course before returning to Bangalore. He proceeded to work as an associate director with G. K. Mudduraj on Rayara Maga (1994) and Kannamuchchale; Dorai–Bhagavan; and with A. R. Babu on Hello Yama. Producer Anand Balaraju offered him an opportunity to direct his first film Kariya (2003) independently.

Kariya was a gangster romance film starring Darshan in the lead. The film was critically acclaimed and appreciated by the audience. Prem was lauded for his casting of real life big dons to act in his movie. The soundtrack and cinematography were also widely appreciated. Darshan played a gangster struggling to express his love. The same year, Prem directed the light-hearted romantic film Excuse Me with Ajay Rao, Sunil Raoh and Ramya in the lead roles. The film turned out to be a musical hit with many of its songs composed by R. P. Patnaik becoming chart busters.

In 2005, Prem came out with his biggest blockbuster film, Jogi, starring Shivarajkumar, Jennifer Kotwal and Arundhati Nag in the lead roles. The film made record collections at the box-office. The mother-son sentiment theme was widely applauded and was considered as Shivarajkumar's biggest comeback film.

Following three back-to-back super hit films, Prem tried his hand at acting besides directing the film Ee Preethi Yeke Bhoomi Melide in 2008. The film's pre-release promotions received much media attention and expectations of the film were high. Bollywood actress Mallika Sherawat made her debut in South Indian films with a special appearance. The film was widely popular for its melodious sound tracks.

Prem next directed the film Raaj the Showman in 2010. It starred Puneeth Rajkumar and Priyanka Kothari. It is remembered mostly for its soundtrack by V. Harikrishna and cinematography. The movie was an average grosser at the box office despite the presence of the heavyweights Puneeth Rajkumar and V. Harikrishna.

Prem, for the first time without himself directing, accepted the lead role in the controversial film titled Prem Adda, a remake of the Tamil blockbuster hit Subramaniapuram with music by V.Harikrishna directed by Mahesh Babu. The film made an average collection in box office. Under his production house Premdreams he produced and acted in the movie DK in 2014.

Prem's , Ek Love Ya, has been released. The movie stars debutant Raanna and is produced by Rakshita Prem.

Prem's new movie is KD-The Devil starring Dhruva Sarja and Sanjay Dutt which is said to be releasing in Early 2024.

Filmography

Discography

References

External links 
 

1976 births
Living people
Kannada film directors
Male actors in Kannada cinema
Kannada playback singers
Kannada-language lyricists
People from Mandya district
21st-century Indian film directors
Film directors from Bangalore
Indian male playback singers
Singers from Bangalore
Male actors from Bangalore
Indian male film actors